. He won the silver medal in the men's 1500m freestyle at the 1952 Summer Olympics in Helsinki, Finland. He broke the world record in the same event on August 16, 1949, clocking 18:35.7. That time was bettered the same day, however, by compatriot Hironoshin Furuhashi at the American Swimming Championships in Los Angeles, California.

Hashizume took up swimming at school. He continued swimming at Nihon University, which he entered in 1946 and graduated in 1951 with a law degree. Between 1952 and 1955 he worked for an insurance company, and then ran a swimming club in Yokohama. In 1987 he was awarded the Order of the Purple Ribbon "Shiju Hosho", and in 1992 inducted into the International Swimming Hall of Fame. 

Hashizume was married and has one daughter and one son. He was a member of the Board of Education in Yokohama City. Hashizume died from prostate cancer on March 9, 2023, at the age of 94.

See also
 List of members of the International Swimming Hall of Fame
 World record progression 800 metres freestyle
 World record progression 1500 metres freestyle

References

1928 births
2023 deaths
Olympic swimmers of Japan
Swimmers at the 1952 Summer Olympics
Olympic silver medalists for Japan
People from Wakayama (city)
World record setters in swimming
Medalists at the 1952 Summer Olympics
Japanese male freestyle swimmers
Olympic silver medalists in swimming
20th-century Japanese people
Deaths from prostate cancer
Deaths from cancer in Japan